D&D is Dungeons & Dragons, a fantasy role-playing game.

D&D may also refer to:

Art, entertainment, and media

Film
 Dumb and Dumber, a 1994 film
 D. B. Weiss and David Benioff, writing partners and creators of the American television series Game of Thrones

Games
 dnd (computer game), a 1974 computer game

Music
 D&D (band), a Japanese girl band
 "D&D", a song by Stephen Lynch

Other uses
 Denial and deception, espionage strategies
 Dine and dash
 Distress and Diversion, an international standard radio frequency for aviation distress
 Drag-and-drop, clicking on an object in a computer interface and dragging it to a different location
 Public intoxication is also known as drunk and disorderly
 Drinking and driving
 D&D London, a restaurant group, formerly Conran Restaurants

See also
 Dungeons & Dragons (disambiguation)
 DnD (disambiguation)